Phoenix Laulu-Togaga'e (born 16 April 2003) is a rugby league footballer who plays at  or on the  for Hull Kingston Rovers in the Super League.

Background
Laulu-Togaga'e was born in Brisbane, Australia but moved to the United Kingdom when he was seven. He is the son of Samoan international rugby league player, Quentin Laulu-Togaga'e.  At school, Laulu-Togaga'e played rugby union at school and was member of the academy side at Leicester Tigers.

Playing career

Keighley Cougars
Quentin Laulu-Togaga'e played for Keighley Cougars and with the Tigers' academy side suspended due to the COVID-19 pandemic, Laulu-Togaga'e was invited to train with Keighley Cougars.  Keighley were impressed with Phoenix and in March 2021 the club signed him on a one year contract. After playing in a pre-season game, Laulu-Togaga'e made his professional debut for Keighley against West Wales Raiders on 13 June 2021. His father played in the same match and when Phoenix came on as an interchange player they became the first instance of father and son playing in the same professional match since 2013 and only the third father-son pairing ever.

Hull KR
After playing a handful of games for Keighley, Laulu-Togaga'e was spotted by Super League side, Hull Kingston Rovers, and was signed on a two-year contract in August 2021 but was loaned back to Keighley for the remainder of the 2021 season

At the end of the 2021 season Laulu-Togaga'e had made 12 appearances for Keighley, scoring five tries and won the Rugby Football League's League 1 Young Player of the Year award

Laulu-Togaga'e made his Super League debut for Hull Kingston Rovers on 25 February 2022, as an interchange player during Rover's 26–10 victory over Castleford Tigers.

Dewsbury Rams (loan)
The following week he appeared for Championship side Dewsbury Rams with whom Hull Kingston Rovers have a dual registration agreement for the 2022 season.

Rochdale Hornets (loan)
Laulu-Togaga'e also had a period on loan at Rochdale Hornets in 2022.

Notes

References

2003 births
Living people
Australian expatriate sportspeople in England
Dewsbury Rams players
Hull Kingston Rovers players
Keighley Cougars players
Rochdale Hornets players
Rugby league players from Brisbane
Rugby league fullbacks
Rugby league wingers